"New Skin" is a song by American rock band Incubus and was released as the second single from its second album, S.C.I.E.N.C.E.. It reached #38 on the Billboard Active Rock chart in 1998. This song originally appeared on the demo Let Me Tell Ya 'Bout Root Beer in 1995. It was featured as the intro song to the PC game Motocross Madness 2 developed by Rainbow Studios, and also makes an appearance in the soundtrack of Test Drive Off Road 3 developed by Infogrames North America. The song's bridge quotes Buckminster Fuller's quote, "Up to the Twentieth Century, reality was everything humans could touch, smell, see, and hear. Since the initial publication of the chart of the electromagnetic spectrum, humans have learned that what they can touch, smell, see, and hear is less than one-millionth of reality."

The song was covered by The One Hundred for the Metal Hammer Goes '90s cover album.

Reception 
New Skin was ranked #1 by Billboard on their list of Incubus' 11 greatest songs.

Track listing
US Promo CD (1997)
 "New Skin"

US Promo CD (1998)
 "New Skin"
 "CD ROM data Track"

Credits

Incubus
 Cornelius – lead vocals, djembe
 Jawa – guitar, backing vocals
 Dirk Lance – bass
 DJ Lyfe – turntables, keyboards
 Badmammajamma – drums

References

1998 singles
Incubus (band) songs
Songs written by Brandon Boyd
Songs written by Mike Einziger
Songs written by Alex Katunich
Songs written by José Pasillas